The Saint Seiya Original Soundtrack I–VIII are eight CDs, released independently, containing the original soundtrack (OST) of the Saint Seiya anime. In addition to the music from the anime, these CDs also include the OSTs from four of the Saint Seiya movies: Evil Goddess Eris, The Heated Battle of the Gods, Legend of Crimson Youth and Warriors of the Final Holy Battle. The music was composed by Seiji Yokoyama and interpreted by the Andromeda Armonique Orchestra. The female voice acting in all of the albums was Kazuko Kawashima (川島和子).

It was one of the first soundtracks to be released not with traditional J-Pop songs, but as background music.

Saint Seiya OST I
The first OST contains background music from the first part of the anime (Sanctuary saga). It was released on January 21, 1987, by Nippon Columbia.

Saint Seiya OST II
The second OST contains background music from the first part of the anime (Sanctuary), as well as the soundtrack of the first movie, Evil Goddess Eris. It was released on August 1, 1987, by Nippon Columbia.

Saint Seiya OST III
The third OST contains more background music from the first part of the anime (Sanctuary), as well as the opening and ending themes "Pegasus Fantasy" and "Forever Blue". It was released on December 21, 1987, by Nippon Columbia.

Saint Seiya OST IV
The fourth CD contains the soundtrack from the second Saint Seiya movie, The Heated Battle of the Gods. It was released by Nippon Columbia on April 1, 1988, with the subtitle .

Saint Seiya OST V
The fifth CD contains the soundtrack from the third Saint Seiya movie, Legend of Crimson Youth. It was released by Nippon Columbia on August 21, 1988, with the subtitle .

Saint Seiya OST VI
The sixth CD contains the soundtrack from the second part of the anime (Asgard saga), as well as instrumental versions of the opening and ending themes "Soldier Dream" and "Blue Dream". It was released by Nippon Columbia on October 1, 1988, with the subtitle .

Saint Seiya OST VII
The seventh CD contains the soundtrack from the third part of the anime, the Poseidon saga. It was released by Nippon Columbia on December 21, 1988, with the subtitle .

Saint Seiya OST VIII
The eighth CD contains the soundtrack from the fourth Saint Seiya movie, Warriors of the Final Holy Battle. It was released by Nippon Columbia on April 8, 1989, with the subtitle .

References

Albums by Japanese artists
1987 soundtrack albums
1988 soundtrack albums
1989 soundtrack albums
Anime soundtracks
Original Soundtrack I-VIII